Brittney Zamora (born April 27, 1999) is an American professional stock car racing driver who last competed part-time in the ARCA Menards Series, driving the No. 30 Ford for Rette Jones Racing. She previously drove for Bill McAnally Racing full-time in the ARCA Menards Series West and part-time in the ARCA Menards Series East.

Racing career

Before entering NASCAR, Zamora traveled the super late model racing circuit in Washington and Oregon. She drove in the Northwest Super Late Model Series in 2017 and 2018, and became the first female to win a race and a championship in the series. In both years racing in that series, she won the championship. In 2018, Zamora was the Washington State Rookie of the Year in NASCAR's Whelen All-American Series. She was one of 12 drivers invited to NASCAR's 2019 Drive for Diversity combine.

In January 2019, Zamora was confirmed as the driver of the No. 99 Toyota Camry for Bill McAnally Racing, competing full-time in the K&N Pro Series West and part-time in the K&N Pro Series East.

McAnally announced their 2020 West Series driver lineup on January 14, 2020, and Zamora was not included. She was replaced by rookie driver Gracie Trotter in the team's No. 99 for the full season.

Zamora announced on March 16, 2020, that she would be returning to the West Series, competing in the No. 42 Ford for Jefferson Racing in the race at Irwindale Speedway. This ended up being her only stock car start of the season.

In 2021, Zamora debuted in the ARCA Menards Series by participating in the series' preseason test session in January at Daytona ahead of the season-opening race there in February. Zamora drove for driver Eric Caudell in his own No. 7 car during the test session. When Caudell returned as the driver of his car for the Daytona race, Zamora drove for Rette Jones Racing in their No. 30.

On October 9, 2021, Zamora won a 100-lap Pro Late Model feature race at Nashville Fairgrounds Speedway, becoming the first woman to win a race in the track's premier division.

Motorsports career results

NASCAR
(key) (Bold – Pole position awarded by qualifying time. Italics – Pole position earned by points standings or practice time. * – Most laps led.)

K&N Pro Series East

ARCA Menards Series
(key) (Bold – Pole position awarded by qualifying time. Italics – Pole position earned by points standings or practice time. * – Most laps led.)

ARCA Menards Series West

References

External links

 
 

Living people
1999 births
People from Kennewick, Washington
Racing drivers from Washington (state)
NASCAR drivers
ARCA Menards Series drivers
American female racing drivers
21st-century American women